Richard Arthur Hayward (born November 28, 1947), also known as Skip Hayward, was the tribal chairman of the Mashantucket Pequot Tribe from 1975 until November 1, 1998. He was replaced by Kenneth M. Reels. Before becoming the tribal chairman, he worked as a pipefitter at General Dynamics Electric Boat and lived in Stonington, Connecticut. In 1994, the University of Connecticut awarded him an honorary degree.

Early life and education 
Hayward was born on November 28, 1947, in New London, Connecticut, one of 10 children. He married Aline Aurore Champoux and held a variety of jobs before running a clam shack called the Sea Mist Haven near the Mystic Seaport.

Pequot Indian reservation
Hayward's grandmother Elizabeth George died in May 1973. She was the last member of the Pequot Indian tribe, and she still lived on the 214 acre Pequot Indian reservation. She was the only person living on the reservation, so the land passed back to the State of Connecticut when she died. Hayward's family, however, thought that the land should belong to them, not to an Indian tribe, so they attempted to lay claim to it.

In 1975, Hayward met with Thomas Tureen, the head of the Coalition of Eastern Native Americans (CENA), who helped him initiate a land claim on his family's behalf. Tureen and Hayward also discussed obtaining federal recognition from the federal government for his group. Connecticut Governor Ella Grasso gave state recognition in 1976 to Hayward's group as an Indian organization, which called itself the Western Pequots. In 1979, Hayward and the Western Pequots were given a $12,000 grant from the Department of Housing and Urban Development (HUD) to create an economic development plan for the reservation. The group then received a $1.2 million loan from HUD in 1979 for the construction of 15 houses.  Hayward appointed his cousin John Holder as executive director of the housing project.

In 1982, Hayward and his associates devised a way to bypass the official process of acquiring Federal recognition of an Indian tribe, which legally required the involvement of the Bureau of Indian Affairs (BIA). Their approach allowed the Western Pequot group to avoid the BIA altogether, because they did not have any sort of historical records or any way to demonstrate the "blood quantum" requirements which proved that they were an actual, historical Indian tribe. They were represented at the Congressional hearing concerning their proposed settlement bill by Tureen and a lawyer named Jackson King. King worked out a deal with Tureen that, in the proposed settlement bill, they would also ask the Federal government to give them enough money to buy out the landowners whom King was representing. That bill was approved by the Senate in February 1983.

President Reagan vetoed the bill, however, stating that it would set a dangerous precedent for creating other new tribes, but Senator Lowell Weicker began to lobby against the President. He raised Congressional supporters who threatened to override the veto, so President Reagan compromised; and thus the Western Pequots were given Federal recognition, calling themselves the Mashantucket Pequot Tribe of Connecticut.

Casino gambling
Hayward and Tureen immediately started planning a high-stakes bingo operation. Neither of them had any experience in running a business, so Hayward sought out Howard Wilson, a member of the Penobscot tribe and a veteran bingo operator. The bingo hall opened on July 5, 1986, and was generating as much as $30 million a year in revenues by 1988.

The Indian Gaming Regulatory Act (IGRA) was passed in 1988, and Hayward and Tureen saw that a casino situated on an Indian reservation would be a highly profitable enterprise. They found overseas financial backers Malaysia's Genting, and Foxwoods Casino began its business in 1992. By 1998, the casino was generating more than a billion dollars in revenue and Hayward was a multimillionaire. The Mashantucket Pequot Tribe grew from one person (while Hayward's grandmother Elizabeth George was alive) to 125 members when Hayward organized the Western Pequots, to more than 300 today.

In 1998, Hayward lost the election for tribal chairman to Kenny Reels.  Hayward had been chairman of the tribe since the creation of Western Pequot Indians of Connecticut, Inc. He ran for the position of tribal chairman again in 2002 but lost to Michael J. Thomas.

Notes

References
Jeff Benedict, Without Reservation: How a Controversial Indian Tribe Rose to Power and Built the World's Largest Casino (2001).
Kim Isaac Eisler, Revenge of the Pequots: How a Small Native American Tribe Created the World's Most Profitable Casino (2002).
Brett Duval Fromson, Hitting the Jackpot: The Inside Story of the Richest Indian Tribe in History (2004).

Native American leaders
Pequot people
1947 births
Living people
Native American people from Connecticut